The Right Way is a 1921 American silent drama film distributed by Producers Security. It was directed by Sidney Olcott and starred Joseph Marquis and Edwards Davis. It was sponsored by Thomas Mott Osborne, former warden in Sing Sing prison and a leading advocate in America for prison reform and defender of the Mutual League.

Plot
As described in a film magazine, a rich boy (Marquis) follows the path of gilded vice and on the day of his marriage to his sweetheart (Osborne), he uses his skill as a copyist and forges his father's name to obtain funds to satisfy the demands of a woman of the underworld. With its inevitable discovery, his Spartan father (Davis) allows the law to take its course and the rich boy is sent to prison. There he meets the poor boy (D'Albrook) serving time for burglary, and the two spend time under traditional prison system solitary confinement, ball and chain, and lockstep. The poor boy is released when his sentence expires, but is soon returned after a new crime. In the meantime a new warden (Brooks) has introduced reforms promoted by Osborne. With the establishment of an honor system and other changes, the two boys are soon transferred from sullen convicts to workers waiting for the expiration of their sentences. The two boys learn that a man is to be executed for a crime of which he is innocent, so they escape from prison, capture the Chinaman who committed the murder, and bring him to the prison. However, they are too late and the man was executed minutes prior to their arrival. At the end of their sentences, the two boys return to their mothers and sweethearts.

Cast
Joseph Marquis as the rich boy
Sidney D'Albrook as the poor boy
Edwards Davis as the rich boy's father
Helen Lindroth as the rich boy's mother
Vivienne Osborne as the rich boy's sweetheart
Anniez Ecleston as the poor boy's mother
Helen Ferguson as the poor boy's sweetheart
Elsie MacLeod as the poor boy's sister
Tammany Young as the smiler
Thomas Brooks as the new warden

Production notes
Working title of the film was The Gray Brother. Sidney Olcott was a member of Mutual league for prisoners.

References

External links

 The Right Way website dedicated to Sidney Olcott

1921 films
American silent feature films
Films directed by Sidney Olcott
1921 drama films
Silent American drama films
American black-and-white films
1920s American films